Mathew Head (born 9 May 1982) is an Australian former professional rugby league footballer who played in the 2000s and 2010s as a  for the St. George Illawarra Dragons, Wests Tigers and Hull F.C.

Background
Head was born in Wagga Wagga, New South Wales, Australia.

Playing career

St. George Illawarra Dragons
Head began his professional rugby league career in 2003, making his first grade debut in round 3 on 29 March 2003. He was the 2004 St. George Illawarra Dragons season's top point-scorer. Head's career has been plagued by recurring knee injuries , thus leaving the club at the end of the 2007 season.

Hull
In 2007, Head signed for Hull F.C. until the end of that season in a bid to help the club reach the Super League play-offs which they defeated the 2nd week of the playoffs to Wigan Warriors.

Wests Tigers
In November 2007, after announcing his desire to return to Australia, Head was signed by the Wests Tigers on a one-year contract. Fitness levels and injuries again limited his time on field during the 2008 season.

Return to the St. George Illawarra Dragons
In August 2008, Head agreed to a return to the Dragons in 2009. His contract with the Dragons was not renewed and he then returned to his junior team Dapto Canaries and became their captain coach in the 2010 season.

Coaching career
Head was the Balmain Tigers SG Ball head coach between 2013 and 2015, winning the SG Ball in 2013 and the under 20's coach for the St George Illawarra Dragons club in 2016.  In 2017, he was the Illawarra RLFC coach in the NSW Cup. In 2019, Head was coach of the St. George Illawarra Dragons Canterbury Cup team that won the minor premiership. In 2021, Head has recently been appointed head coach of the St. George Illawarra Dragons NRLW team in the upcoming 4 week season.

References

External links
 Mathew Head player profile at St. George Illawarra Dragons
St. George Illawarra Dragons profile

1982 births
Living people
Australian rugby league coaches
Australian rugby league players
Hull F.C. players
Rugby league five-eighths
Rugby league halfbacks
Rugby league players from Wagga Wagga
Shellharbour City Dragons players
St. George Illawarra Dragons players
Wests Tigers players